Mehuín is a Chilean town and harbour, located on the shores of the Pacific Ocean at the mouth of Lingue River. Administratively it belongs to the San José de la Mariquina commune in Valdivia Province of Los Ríos Region. The town is located a few kilometers south of the town of Queule and very close to the border between Los Ríos Region and Araucanía Region.

References

Ports and harbours of Chile
Populated places in Valdivia Province
Coasts of Los Ríos Region